Pycnochromis margaritifer, known commonly as the bicolor chromis, is a species of marine fish in the family Pomacentridae.
The species was reclassified as Pycnochromis margaritifer in 2021,

and is still listed under the former name Chromis margaritifer in some places.

Distribution
The bicolor chromis is widespread throughout the tropical waters of the central Indo-Pacific region until the oceanic islands of the central Pacific Ocean.

Description
The bicolor chromis is a small fish and can reach a maximum size of 9 cm length.

References

External links
 

margaritifer
Fish described in 1946